The Raticosa pass is a mountain pass in the Tuscan-Emilian Apennines located at an altitude of 968 m a.s.l. It is located in the province of Florence, in the municipality of Firenzuola, along the Futa state road 65. Its mountain complex includes some reliefs, including the Canda hill (901 m), Mount Canda (1158 m) and Mount Oggioli; from the latter arises the Idice, an important river in Emilia-Romagna and a tributary of the Reno. The Raticosa pass is a popular spot for cyclists in the area. The finish line of the Bologna-Raticosa time trial is set on the Raticosa pass, an automobile competition valid for the Italian historic mountain championship, which in 2012 has reached its twenty-fifth edition.

References

See also 

 Monghidoro
 Futa pass

External links 

  Wikimedia Commons has media related to Raticosa pass

Mountain passes of Italy
Metropolitan City of Florence
Apennine Mountains